Sean Langmuir (born 9 November 1967 in Grantown-on-Spey) is a British former alpine skier who competed in the 1992 Winter Olympics.

References

1967 births
Living people
Scottish male alpine skiers
Olympic alpine skiers of Great Britain
Alpine skiers at the 1992 Winter Olympics
Sportspeople from Highland (council area)
People from Moray